Puerta del Ángel is a neighborhood (barrio) of Madrid belonging to the district of Latina.

Wards of Madrid
Latina (Madrid)